The Violent Silence (Moroccan Arabic: El Chergui, French: Le Silence violent) is a 1975 film directed by Moumen Smihi. The film was screened at multiple international festivals and was a critical success.

Synopsis 
Set in Tangier on the cusp of Moroccan independence, Aisha, a young woman, uses magical practices to prevent her husband from marrying a second wife. During a final ritual, she drowns.

Cast 
 Leila Shenna
 Abdelkader Moutaa
 Chawki Sail
 Khadija Moujahid
 Aïcha Chairi

Festival and awards 
 1976 International Film Festival Rotterdam
 Festival de Toulon: Grand Prix, Critic's Award

References

External links 
 

1975 films
Moroccan drama films